A list of animated feature films first released in 1983.

See also
 List of animated television series of 1983

References

 Feature films
1983
1983-related lists